Two ships of the United States Navy have been named Crocus after the spring flower of the iris family.

 , was a screw steamer, was built in 1862.
  was a lighthouse tender transferred to the Navy at the beginning of World War I.

Sources
 

United States Navy ship names